Kitfox Games is an indie game development studio based in Montreal, Canada. It was co-founded by Tanya X. Short, Jongwoo Kim, Xin Ran Liu, and Mike Ditchburn in June 2013.

History 
According to Short, the founders never worked together before and knew each other as semi-acquaintances at local independent developer meetup in Montreal. After forming a studio, the team participated in a game jam in which they created and submitted their jam entry Sculptorgeist which became a winning finalist. Kitfox Games began development of their first game Shattered Planet as a procedural death labyrinth game. Shattered Planet was released on iOS and later Android, Microsoft Windows, and MacOS in 2014.

As of 2019, the studio had eight employees.

In March 2019, Kitfox Games partnered with Bay 12 Games to be its publisher for the Steam and itch.io version of Dwarf Fortress. According to a frequently asked questions post, Kitfox Games would manage its relationship with Steam and contractors while Bay 12 Games co-creator Tarn Adams would handle the technical side of the game.

Games published

References 

Video game companies of Canada
Indie video game developers
Companies based in Montreal
Video game companies established in 2013
Canadian companies established in 2013
2013 establishments in Quebec